Chien Tung-ming (born 4 June 1951) is a Taiwanese Paiwan politician. Also known by the Paiwan-language name Uliw Qaljupayare, he represented the Highland Aborigine district from 2008 to 2020, alongside Kao Chin Su-mei and Kung Wen-chi.

Early life and education
Chien graduated from Fang Liao High School in Pingtung County before attending National Pingtung University of Education. He earned a master's degree in public administration and policy at National Chung Hsing University and taught at multiple elementary schools.

Political career
Chen served Shizi Township as mayor for two terms from 1990 to 1998. He was elected to the Pingtung County Council later that year and stepped down in 2007 to prepare for a legislative campaign.

Electoral controversies
Chien was first elected to the Legislative Yuan in 2008 with 26.86% of the vote in the three-member Highland Aborigine district. Prosecutors in Kaohsiung sued Chien in February 2012 as part of a vote-buying probe related to the 2008 elections, and three of his staff were imprisoned, but Chien himself was cleared in 2013. More vote-buying allegations against Chien, this time in his native Pingtung County, surfaced during the 2016 legislative elections. The 2016 case was taken to Taichung District Court, where prosecutors sought an annulment of Chien's election victory. Chien and 57 others, including some of his campaign staff and a number of Pingtung County residents, were indicted in March. The Pingtung District Court issued the first ruling on the case in June 2017, sentencing Chien to five and a half years imprisonment. As a result of the guilty verdict, Chien became the first Taiwanese legislator be suspended from his duties due to court proceedings. Upon appeal in January 2019, Chien's penalty was reduced, and he was acquitted in April of that year by the Kaohsiung branch of the Taiwan High Court. Chien did not run in the 2020 legislative elections, and was succeeded in office by Wu Li-hua in 2020, who contested the seat on behalf of the Democratic Progressive Party.

Legislative actions
Chien coauthored an amendment to the Mountain Slope Conservation and Utilization Act in 2012 that led to criticism from many aboriginal rights groups. The act contained a clause that mandated how long an aborigine was to keep their land before legally selling it. Chin, Kung, and Chien, along with Sra Kacaw, Liao Kuo-tung, and Lin Cheng-er, all aborigines, believed that the five-year ownership period mandated in the law was discriminatory and irrelevant, as the law already stated that all aboriginal land could only be sold to another aborigine. Chien authored another law related to aboriginal land reform in 2015, making it legal for aborigines to receive monetary compensation on land they own within conservation areas because they are barred from developing land marked as protected territory.

Political stances
Chien has often criticized the Council of Indigenous Peoples for not supporting aboriginal people adequately. To give aboriginals more influence in the parliament, he advocated the reestablishment of an aboriginal caucus during his first term in office. In his first term as legislator, Chien opposed a proposal to remove the distinction between highland and lowland districts. Since then, he has proposed that both nationwide aboriginal districts, currently divided by tribal groupings, be divided instead into three separate constituencies based on geography.

Chien has described the Aboriginal Basic Act as ineffective. The law, passed in 2005, mandates that other bills relating to aboriginal affairs should have been passed by 2008. The Democratic Progressive Party administration in power at the time had proposed many initiatives, but most had been stalled in the legislature. Additionally, the Council of Indigenous Peoples had shut down four of the amendments proposed by the deadline.

Though Chien backed marriage between aboriginals and Han Taiwanese, he opposed the legalization of same-sex marriage.

Personal life
He is married to Tai Chin-hua.

References

1951 births
Living people
Politicians of the Republic of China on Taiwan from Pingtung County
Aboriginal Members of the Legislative Yuan
Kuomintang Members of the Legislative Yuan in Taiwan
Members of the 7th Legislative Yuan
Members of the 8th Legislative Yuan
Members of the 9th Legislative Yuan
Paiwan people
National Chung Hsing University alumni
National Pingtung University of Education alumni
Mayors of places in Taiwan
Taiwanese schoolteachers
Taiwanese politicians convicted of fraud
20th-century Taiwanese educators